Ice is a 1998 television disaster film starring Grant Show, Udo Kier, Flex Alexander and Eva La Rue. The film has a premise similar to The Day After Tomorrow, a science fiction disaster film released six years later. Although completely in English, it first premiered in Germany in 1998 before being aired on ABC in the United States in 2000.

Plot

An increase in sunspot activity causes disastrous, long-term consequences for the Earth. Los Angeles is, just as the rest of the world, covered with a layer of ice and snow. The government has collapsed and everyone is on their own. Chaos and crime prevails. Together with scientist Dr. Kistler and a small group of survivors, LAPD officer Robert Drake leaves in the direction of Long Beach Harbor to meet with a government ship which will take them to Guam, where it is warmer.

Cast
 Grant Show as Robert Drake
 Udo Kier as Dr. Norman Kistler
 Eva LaRue as Alison
 Flex Alexander as Kelvin
 Audie England as Julie
 Michael Riley as Greg
 Kyle Fairlie as Max
 Art Hindle as US President
 Diego Fuentes as Zapata
 Kristin Booth as Jessica
 Gordon Michael Woolvett as soldier
 John Bourgeois as Dr. Golding
 Elias Zarou as Dr. Tyson
 Peter Virgile as Chief of Staff
 J.C. Kenny as Newscaster

Production

Reception 
The film received negative reviews for is performances and music

See also
List of disaster films

References

External links
 
 Ice at the New York Times

1998 films
1990s science fiction drama films
1990s disaster films
American disaster films
German disaster films
English-language German films
Films directed by Jean de Segonzac
Films set in Los Angeles
American post-apocalyptic films
1998 drama films
1990s American films
1990s German films